Marcelle Louise Fernande Le Gal  (14 February 1895–23 June 1979) was a French mycologist and lichenologist, and a pioneer of taxonomy of the Pezizomycetes.

Selected publications

Awards 

The fungal genera Marcelleina, Galiella, and Legaliana are named in her honor for her contributions to fungal taxonomy of the Pezizomycetes.

References 

1895 births
1979 deaths
University of Paris alumni
Columbia University alumni
French lichenologists
French mycologists
French taxonomists